Neopsammodius is a genus of aphodiine dung beetles in the family Scarabaeidae. There are about nine described species in Neopsammodius.

Species
These nine species belong to the genus Neopsammodius:
 Neopsammodius blandus (Fall, 1932)
 Neopsammodius canoensis (Cartwright, 1955)
 Neopsammodius culminatus (Bates, 1887)
 Neopsammodius interruptus (Say, 1835)
 Neopsammodius mimeticus (Fall, 1932)
 Neopsammodius quinqueplicatus (Horn, 1871)
 Neopsammodius saltilloensis (Cartwright, 1955)
 Neopsammodius veraecrucis (Bates, 1887)
 Neopsammodius werneri (Cartwright, 1955)

References

Further reading

 
 
 

Scarabaeidae
Articles created by Qbugbot